Stronger with Each Tear is the ninth studio album from American R&B and soul singer-songwriter Mary J. Blige.  The album was released in the US on December 21, 2009, under Blige's own imprint, Matriarch Records.

Internationally it was released December 18, 2009, in Australia and Germany, December 21 in France, December 23 in Japan, and on February 2, 2010, in Korea with further international releases (in some cases re-releases) in March, April and May 2010. With this album, Blige achieved a record of nine albums to have debuted at the top of the US R&B/Hip-Hop Albums chart.

Background
Blige started working on her ninth album while she toured with Robin Thicke in 2008. In an interview with Rap-Up magazine she said:
{{cquote|The album represents who and what I am right now. I'm a stronger human being after all the growing pains. It's about life, love, change, strength—mostly really knowing who you are and being confident in that}}

The album was initially titled Stronger, after the song "Stronger", which Blige recorded and released as the lead single from the soundtrack Music Inspired by More than a Game from the LeBron James' documentary More than a Game. However Rap-Up later revealed that the album had been re-titled Stronger with Each Tear.

The album has production and writing credits from Ryan Leslie, Darkchild and Johntá Austin. Also included are several guests like the Canadian rapper Drake who appears on the first single "The One", rapper T.I. who appears on "Good Love" which was initially planned as the second single and Trey Songz himself revealed that he had recorded a duet called "Hood Love" with Blige for the album. The song was previously recorded by Austin and Blige for Austin's first solo album that was never released. The song has since been reworked and re-titled "We Got Hood Love". Following the album's release in the US, the song charted at 82 on the Hot R&B/Hip Hop Songs chart due to strong digital downloads. The album track "I Feel Good" entered the Hot R&B/Hip-Hop Songs chart at number 83 on the issue dated February 6, 2010, and on the issue dated March 6, 2010, it reached a peak of number 68. whilst "Good Love" featuring T.I. entered the Hot R&B/Hip-Hop Songs chart at number 59 and was on the charts for around eleven weeks with a peak of 58.

Australian media outlets revealed that the international version of the album would be released with an altered track listing. The new version of the album had a duet version of the song "Each Tear" with the Australian artist Vanessa Amorosi. There are also four other versions of the track performed by the Italian singer Tiziano Ferro and the UK singer Jay Sean, Rea Garvey and K'naan. According to HMV, it would also include cover versions of the Led Zeppelin song "Stairway to Heaven", "Whole Lotta Love" and the song  "Stronger" from the soundtrack More than a Game. The international version of the album removed the songs "Said and Done", "We Got Hood Love" and "Kitchen" from the tracklist, and replaced them with "Whole Lotta Love", "I Can't Wait", "City on Fire", "Stronger", "Stairway to Heaven" and a remix of "I Am" by Dave Audé.

Release and promotion
The album was originally scheduled for US release on November 24, 2009 but this was pushed back to December 15, 2009 which would have put Blige's album in a chart battle with Alicia Keys' album The Element of Freedom. The album was pushed back once more to December 21, 2009.

After a number of appearances to promote the song "Stronger" for the soundtrack Music Inspired by More than a Game, Blige formally began the album's promotion in America by premiering the second single "I Am" at the American Music Awards (2009). The following day she appeared on the Lopez Tonight show for an interview and encore performance of "I Am". Blige also appeared on The Jay Leno Show, The Today Show, and was also on a special shown on BET named Words & Sounds With Mary J. Blige. She was on a taping of The View. On April 21, 2010 Blige appeared on American Idol's charity telethon, Idol Gives Back to perform her cover of Led Zeppelin's "Stairway to Heaven" with Orianthi and Randy Jackson on guitars.

On April 13, 2010, Blige appeared on an episode of The Oprah Winfrey Show where she performed "Each Tear" and her version of the "Stairway to Heaven", which appears on the Stronger with Each Tear international edition and on iTunes as a digital single.

Singles
 "The One", featuring Drake was released as the album's first single in the US and Australia on July 21, 2009. Featuring Drake, the song was co-written by Ester Dean and produced by Rodney Jerkins. It peaked at number sixty-three on the US Billboard Hot 100.
 "I Am" which was written by Blige, Johntá Austin and Ester Dean with music produced by Stargate, was released as the first international single (second in the US) in December 2009. It debuted on the Hot R&B/Hip Hop Songs chart at number forty-six prior to its full release and peaked at number four upon release. It debuted on Japan's Oricon chart at number 92 and peaked at number 11 on that chart, while also debuting on the Hot 100 at sixty-seven and peaking at number fifty-five. It was also the international lead single from the album.
 "Each Tear" was released as the second international single from the album in February 2010. There are different versions of the song. For Australia, it features the singer-songwriter Vanessa Amorosi; for Italy, Tiziano Ferro; for the UK, Jay Sean; for Germany, Rea Garvey and for Canada, K'naan. Marcus Raboy filmed a video which was then edited to show each of the guests in versions for their respective markets. It peaked at number one in Italy and number 183 in the UK, while failing to chart elsewhere. The single was not released in the United States.
"We Got Hood Love" featuring Trey Songz was released as the third US single from the album on March 30, 2010. The song debuted at number eighty-two on the Hot R&B/Hip-Hop Songs chart following the album's release due to strong digital downloads and radio airplay. A video was filmed with Mary J. Blige and football player George Wilson in Miami, while Trey Songz filmed his scenes in a New York City apartment. Chris Robinson directed the video for the single with a planned May 10, 2010 premiere through Vevo, though it actually appeared on Rap-Up on May 6, 2010.

Other songs
"Stairway to Heaven" was released on April 13, 2010, as an iTunes only  release. Available as a download only and with no video the Led Zeppelin cover features Travis Barker, Randy Jackson, Steve Vai and Orianthi. Another Zeppelin cover, "Whole Lotta Love", is the single's B-side. The songs only appear on the international version of the album. It was released again on April 22, 2010, to raise money for American Idols Idol Gives Back.

Critical reception

Reviewers' response to the album was mostly positive, holding a score of 75 out of 100 on music review aggregation website Metacritic. Andy Kellman from Allmusic said "Stronger with Each Tear is a very good Blige album, if not quite a classic. One of her briefest sets, it is tremendously (almost studiously) balanced between all the ground she has covered so well before. That's no criticism, though, since most of the songs are easily memorable and display so much range. Those who detest "The One" on principle, for its use of Auto-Tune, need only to forward to the album's final song, a quiet and sparse throwback (to 40-plus years ago) production from Raphael Saadiq in which Blige professes new love to chilling effect." Mikael Wood from Spin magazine also liked the album saying "Mary J. Blige has spent the past decade effecting a slow transformation from R&B's queen of pain to the closest thing the genre counts to Oprah Winfrey. Judging by the titles on Blige's latest, that transformation is almost complete: 'Good Love,' 'I Feel Good,' 'I Love U (Yes I Du).' It's hard to believe this is the same woman who once felt the need to announce she was done with drama. Yet despite the conviction that those track names suggest—and despite solid writing and production contributions from A-listers [...] it feels less vital than 2005's terrific The Breakthrough or 2007's Growing Pains [...] The result is minor Mary—strong by many standards, a bit tepid by hers." In his Consumer Guide, Robert Christgau offered the description, "plainspoken, low-drama, midtempo love vows, with attempted glamour relegated to the cover shoot", while naming "Tonight" and "I Am" as the record's highlights.

Commercial performance
The album debuted at number two on the US Billboard 200 chart with first-week sales of 332,000 copies. It also went to number one on the R&B chart. Blige is the ninth woman in SoundScan's 18-year history to see at least three albums all debut with an opening sales week of 300,000 or more. Stronger with Each Tear'' had sold 726,100 copies in the United States by April 2010, and was certified Gold by the RIAA on January 6, 2011.

In the UK, it debuted at number 33 on the main albums chart in its first week but dropped out of the top forty on its second week. On the UK R&B Chart it debuted at number four and fell nine places to number 13 in its second week.

Track listing

Notes
In the US, "Each Tear" is a solo song, but on international versions feature Jay Sean except for in Italy where it features Tiziano Ferro; Vanessa Amorosi for Australia; Rea Garvey for Germany; and K'naan for Canada.

Personnel

Kory Aaron – assistant engineer
Mary J. Blige – executive producer, vocals, backing vocals, co-writer
Dylan "3-D" Dresdow – mix engineer
Jaime Martinez – assistant engineer
Aubry "Big Juice" Delaine – engineer
 Steven Dennis – assistant engineer
Pat Dillett – engineer
Mike "Handz" Donaldson – engineer
Mikkel S. Eriksen – engineer
Ron Fair – vocal tracking
Drew FitzGerald – creative director
Brian "Big Bass" Gardner – mastering
Thaddis Kuk Harrell – vocal tracking
Tal Herzberg – engineer
Josh Houghkirk – mixing assistant
Kendu Isaacs – producer, management
Jaycen Joshua – mixing
Jaha Johnson – management
Kim Kimble – hair stylist
Damien Lewis – engineer
Giancarlo Lino – mixing assistant
Anthony Mandler – photography

Tony Mardini – engineer
D'Andre Michael – make-up
Peter Mokran – mixing
Luis Navarro – assistant engineer
Carlos Oyanedel – engineer
Tal Oz – assistant
Dave Pensado – mixing
Marni Senofonte – stylist
Jason Sherwood – assistant engineer
Allen Sides – engineer
Clifford Harris Jr. – featured artist
Aubrey Graham – featured artist
Tremaine Neverson – featured artist
Allen Sodes – string engineer
The Stereotypes – engineer
Phil Tan – mixing
Brian "B-Luv" Thomas – engineer
Sam Thomas – engineer
Pat Thrall – engineer
Jenifer Tracy – design
Pat Viola – vocal engineer
Eric Weaver – assistant
Frank Wolf – string engineer
Andrew Wuepper – engineer

Charts

Weekly charts

Year-end charts

Certifications

Accolades

Release history

Original release

Reissue release

References

2009 albums
Mary J. Blige albums
Interscope Geffen A&M Records albums
Albums produced by Bryan-Michael Cox
Albums produced by Hit-Boy
Albums produced by Jeff Bhasker
Albums produced by Ne-Yo
Albums produced by Polow da Don
Albums produced by Rodney Jerkins
Albums produced by Ron Fair
Albums produced by the Runners
Albums produced by Ryan Leslie
Albums produced by Raphael Saadiq
Albums produced by Tricky Stewart
Geffen Records albums
Albums produced by J.U.S.T.I.C.E. League
Albums produced by Akon
Albums produced by Stargate
Albums produced by Plain Pat
Albums produced by The-Dream